Debra Elaine Houry is an American physician. She is the acting principal deputy director of the Centers for Disease Control and Prevention, having formally served as the Director of	the	National Center	for	Injury Prevention and Control.

Early life and education
Houry was born and raised in Virginia. She completed her undergraduate degree at Emory University in 1994 with a double major in biology and philosophy. She also volunteered at Children's Healthcare of Atlanta at Egleston, worked as a house staff assistant at Grady Hospital. From Emory, Houry entered the dual medical degree and MPH program at Tulane University. Following this, she trained in emergency medicine at Denver Health Medical Center and received the Council of Emergency Medicine Residency Directors Resident Academic Achievement Award.

Career
Following her residency, Houry became an assistant professor of emergency medicine and of occupational and environmental health at Emory University, as well as associate director of Emory’s Center for Injury Control. While serving in this role, Houry was elected as the president of the Society for Academic Emergency Medicine.

In May 2013, Houry was selected as a Fellow in the Hedwig van Ameringen Executive Leadership in Academic Medicine program to prepare women for senior leadership roles in academic health institutions. The following year, she was appointed director of the National Center for Injury Prevention and Control (NCIPC) at the Centers for Disease Control and Prevention (CDC). During her tenure at the CDC, Houry oversaw the release of "Guidelines for Prescribing Opioids for Chronic Pain," which gives providers research and academic evidence for managing patient opioid prescriptions.

As a result of her research, Houry was elected a member of the National Academy of Medicine in 2019 and appointed acting principal deputy director of the CDC.

References

Living people
Physicians from Virginia
21st-century American women physicians
21st-century American physicians
Members of the National Academy of Medicine
Tulane University alumni
Emory University alumni
Emory University faculty
Year of birth missing (living people)